Maria Janna "Marjan" Schwegman (born 20 February 1951, Middenmeer) is a Dutch historian who was managing director of the NIOD Institute for War, Holocaust and Genocide Studies from March 2007 to 18 February 2016. Besides that, she is a professor in Politics and Culture in the 20th century at the faculty of Humanities at Utrecht University.

From 2003 to 2007 Marjan Schwegman was managing director of the Royal Netherlands Institute in Rome. Previously she worked at the University of Amsterdam, Leiden University, Maastricht University and Utrecht University. In Utrecht she was bijzonder hoogleraar (endowed professor) women's history.

She was part of the Commissie-Davids (an independent commission supervised by jurist Willibrord Davids) which looked into the decision making process for the Dutch support in the Iraq War.

On 18 February 2016 Jet Bussemaker decorated her with the title officier in de Orde van Oranje-Nassau. (officer in the Order of Orange-Nassau)

References 

1951 births
Living people
20th-century Dutch historians
Dutch women historians
Academic staff of Utrecht University
University of Amsterdam alumni
People from Wieringermeer
21st-century Dutch historians